Payette Junction is a highway junction and unincorporated community in Malheur County, Oregon, United States. It lies at the intersection of Oregon Route 52 and Oregon Route 201 between Ontario, Oregon, and Weiser, Idaho. It is about a mile from Payette, Idaho, on the other side of the Snake River, which marks the Oregon–Idaho border in this vicinity.

References

Unincorporated communities in Malheur County, Oregon
Unincorporated communities in Oregon